Pru West District is one of the eleven districts in Bono East Region, Ghana. Originally it was formerly part of the then-larger Pru District on 18 February 2004, until the western part of the district was split off to create Pru West District on 15 March 2018; thus the remaining part has been renamed as Pru East District. The district assembly is located in the east central part of Bono East Region and has Prang as its capital town.

Boundaries 
The district is bounded on the north by the Pru East district, Sene West district to the east, Nkoranza South Municipal District and Atebubu-Amantin Municipal District to the south and Kintampo North Municipal District and Kintampo South District to the west.

Settlements 
The ten most populated areas in the region include Prang the capital, Zabrama, Dama-Nkwanta, Abease, Komfourkrom, Beposo, Buipe, Aboa, Adabrase and Ajalaja. There are 88 localities within the district. The district is also divided into the Prang Town Council, Abease Area Council and the Ajaraja/Beposo Area Council.

Administration 
The administrative head of the district is the District Chief Executive who is appointed by the President of Ghana after consultation.

References 

Districts of Bono East Region
Populated places in the Bono East Region
States and territories established in 2003